Andrew McConnell January Cochran (February 4, 1854 – June 12, 1934) was a United States district judge of the United States District Court for the Eastern District of Kentucky.

Education and career

Born in Maysville, Kentucky, Cochran received an Artium Baccalaureus degree from Centre College in 1873 and a Bachelor of Laws from Harvard Law School in 1877. He was in private practice in Maysville from 1877 to 1901.

Federal judicial service

Cochran received a recess appointment from President William McKinley on April 24, 1901, to the United States District Court for the Eastern District of Kentucky, to a new seat authorized by 31 Stat. 781. He was nominated to the same position by President Theodore Roosevelt on December 5, 1901. He was confirmed by the United States Senate on December 17, 1901, and received his commission the same day. His service terminated on June 12, 1934, due to his death.

References

Sources
 

1854 births
1934 deaths
Centre College alumni
Harvard Law School alumni
Judges of the United States District Court for the Eastern District of Kentucky
People from Maysville, Kentucky
United States federal judges appointed by William McKinley
United States federal judges appointed by Theodore Roosevelt